Archibald Taylor (28 November 1879 – 14 March 1966) was a Scottish professional footballer who played as a full back in England and Scotland for Dundee, Falkirk, West Ham United, Huddersfield Town and Barnsley.

Career
Taylor captained the Barnsley team which won the FA Cup in 1912, by beating West Bromwich Albion in a replay, after the first match ended goalless. The Manchester Guardian, when reporting on the first match noted that he kept Albion outside forward Jephcott in check. In the replay his play was again praised. Earlier in his career, he won the FA Cup with Bolton Wanderers in 1904. After his retirement, he served Dundee as assistant trainer.

Career statistics

Honours
Bolton Wanderers
 FA Cup: 1903–04

Barnsley
FA Cup: 1911–12

References

External links 
 (Bolton Wanderers)
 (Barnsley)

1879 births
Scottish footballers
Footballers from Dundee
Association football fullbacks
English Football League players
Falkirk F.C. players
West Ham United F.C. players
Huddersfield Town A.F.C. players
Barnsley F.C. players
1966 deaths
East Craigie F.C. players
Bolton Wanderers F.C. players
Bristol Rovers F.C. players
Brentford F.C. players
Dundee F.C. players
Scottish Football League players
Southern Football League players
Raith Rovers F.C. players
York City F.C. (1908) players
Dundee F.C. non-playing staff
FA Cup Final players